Heavy Soul is the debut album by American saxophonist Ike Quebec, recorded in 1961 and released on the Blue Note label.

Reception

The Allmusic review by Scott Yanow awarded the album 4 stars and stated "Thick-toned tenor Ike Quebec is in excellent form... His ballad statements are quite warm, and he swings nicely on a variety of medium-tempo material".

Track listing
All compositions by Ike Quebec except as indicated

 "Acquitted" - 5:38
 "Just One More Chance" (Sam Coslow, Arthur Johnston) - 5:50
 "Que's Dilemma" - 4:29
 "Brother, Can You Spare a Dime?" (Jay Gorney, Yip Harburg) - 5:28
 "The Man I Love" (Gershwin, Gershwin) - 6:31
 "Heavy Soul" - 6:51
 "I Want a Little Girl" (Murray Mencher, Billy Moll) - 5:22
 "Nature Boy" (eden ahbez) - 2:44
 "Blues for Ike" (Roach) - 5:54 Bonus track on CD

Personnel
Ike Quebec - tenor saxophone
Freddie Roach - organ (tracks 1-7 & 9)
Milt Hinton - bass
Al Harewood - drums (tracks 1-7 & 9)

References

Blue Note Records albums
Ike Quebec albums
1962 albums
Albums recorded at Van Gelder Studio
Albums produced by Alfred Lion